Stichomyces is a genus of fungi in the family Laboulbeniaceae. The genus contain 7 species.

References

External links
Stichomyces at Index Fungorum

Laboulbeniomycetes